Karl Zolper (born 30 April 1901, date of death unknown) was a German international footballer.

References

1901 births
Year of death missing
Association football goalkeepers
German footballers
Germany international footballers
Alemannia Aachen managers
German football managers